Tamil Nadu Tourism Development Corporation is a state-government Public Sector Undertaking of the Government of Tamil Nadu located in the Indian state of Tamil Nadu.  Tamil Nadu has been entrusted with the promotion of tourism and development of tourist related infrastructure. In July 1971, Tamil Nadu Tourism Development Corporation was initiated by M. Karunanidhi, then Chief Minister of Tamil Nadu.

References

External links
Official website
For Online Booking of Tours & Hotels from Official site 

State tourism development corporations of India
Tourism in Tamil Nadu
State agencies of Tamil Nadu
1971 establishments in Tamil Nadu
Government agencies established in 1971